xbiff is a small utility for the X Window System that shows a mailbox with its flag raised whenever the user has new e-mail. It is included in almost every X Window System.

See also 
 biff (Unix)

External links 
Manual page

X Window programs